The following is an overview of 2016 in Chinese music. It lists events and Chinese music released publicly in mainland China. Music in the Chinese language (Mandarin and Cantonese) and artists from Chinese-speaking countries (Mainland China, Hong Kong, Taiwan, Malaysia, and Singapore) will be included.

TV Shows
I Am a Singer (season 4) (January 15 – April 15)
Sing! China (season 1) (July 15 – October 7)
Sing My Song (season 3) (January 29 – April 8)

Awards
2016 China Music Awards
2016 Chinese Music Awards
2016 Chinese Top Ten Music Awards
2016 Global Chinese Golden Chart Awards
2016 Global Chinese Music Awards
2016 Ku Music Asian Music Awards
2016 Migu Music Awards
2016 MTV Europe Music Awards Best Chinese & Hong Kong Act: G.E.M.
2016 Music Pioneer Awards
2016 Music Radio China Top Chart Awards
2016 QQ Music Awards
2016 Top Chinese Music Awards
The 4th V Chart Awards

Releases

First quarter

January

February

March

Second quarter

April

May

Third quarter

Fourth quarter

Unscheduled albums

Deaths

See also
2016 in China
List of Billboard China V Chart number-one songs of 2016
ABU Radio Song Festival 2016

References 

 
2016 in music